Hog Cay may refer to:

Hog Cay, Exuma, an island of the Bahamas
Hog Cay Airport, a private airport
Hog Cay, Long Island, an island of the Bahamas
Hog Cay, Ragged Island, an island of the Bahamas
Hog Cay, Caicos, an island off South Caicos in the Turks and Caicos Islands